KINF or Kinf may refer to:

 KINF-LP, a low-power radio station (107.9 FM) licensed to serve Palestine, Texas, United States
 KDBI (AM), a radio station (730 AM) licensed to serve Boise, Idaho, which held the call sign KINF from 2011 to 2013
 KPDA (FM), a radio station (100.7 FM) licensed to serve Mountain Home, Idaho, which held the call sign KINF-FM from 2011 to 2013
 KXTA-FM, a radio station (99.1 FM) licensed to serve Gooding, Idaho, United States, which held the call sign KINF from 2013 to 2014
 Kids In Need Foundation, a U.S. charity